Zaoyuan is the name of several places in the People's Republic of China.
It may refer to:

 Zaoyuan Township, Xingtai City, Hebei Province.
 Zaoyuan Station, Beijing Subway, Beijing.
 Zaoyuan Subdistrict, Zhangqiu Division, Jinan City, Shandong Province.